Namozine is a rural unincorporated community near the eastern extremity of Amelia County, just south of the Appomattox River in the U.S. state of Virginia. It is the easternmost village in the county and is situated around the intersections of SR 708 (Namozine Road) with SR 623 (Chesdin Lake Road) and SR 622 (Greenes Road / Mill Quarter Road). Just to the southeast, Namozine Creek forms the county line, flowing roughly northeast into the Appomattox at Lake Chesdin.

Namozine is bisected by the border between ZIP codes 23850 (Ford, VA) and 23833 (Church Road, VA); both post offices are across the line in Dinwiddie County. The nearest volunteer fire station to Namozine is at Mannboro, 6 miles west. A station named Namozine Volunteer Fire & EMS Co. 4 is located over 15 miles to the east, in Petersburg.

The word "Namozine" (with several variant spellings, originally "Nummisseen" or "Nammisseen") dates at least to the early 1700s. The name appears to have been used for the creek before it was used for the town in Amelia County; the hamlet may have been called Terrapin Creek until 1841. It was a post village, under the name Namozine, from 1841 until around the turn of the 20th century. An establishment called Whites Store existed in the community as far back as the time of the Civil War, however; and the spot was still noted as "Whites Store", rather than Namozine, on older 20th-century USGS topographic maps.

The historic Namozine Presbyterian Church is located at the intersection of routes 708 and 622. The Rev. Richard McIlwaine, eleventh president of Hampden–Sydney College, briefly served as pastor there just before the Civil War. During the final days of the fighting in Virginia, a phase known as the Appomattox Campaign, Namozine was the site of the Battle of Namozine Church; the church itself was used as a field hospital by both sides. An on-site historical plaque that summarizes the engagement reads in part:

Other historic churches at Namozine include Union Baptist, an African American congregation whose distinctive brick building stands less than half a mile east, also on Namozine Road.

References

External links
Amelia County Historical Society, owner of Namozine Presbyterian Church

Unincorporated communities in Virginia
Unincorporated communities in Amelia County, Virginia